Bethel Park, officially the Municipality of Bethel Park, is a borough with home rule status in Allegheny County, Pennsylvania, United States. The population was 33,577 as of the 2020 census.

History
 
The area that is now Bethel Park was originally settled around 1800 and was first established as Bethel Township, in 1886. It was named after Bethel (meeting house). Bethel Park was incorporated as a borough on March 17, 1949,  and became a home rule municipality in 1978.

The first armored car robbery in the U.S. occurred on March 11, 1927, when a Brinks truck, heading towards the Coverdale Mine about a mile away was attacked. Paul Jaworski and Flatheads gang destroyed the road with dynamite to steal a mining payroll.

Geography
Bethel Park lies at the margin between the Pittsburgh Low Plateau and Waynesburg Hills Sections of the Allegheny Plateau physiographic province. The area is characterized as a maturely dissected region where the ephemeral minor tributaries converge into the tributaries of principal streams.

The highest point in Bethel Park is Rocky Ridge, in the southwestern portion of the borough, and the lowest point is at the intersection of the Piney Fork and Alsip Run creeks, in the southeast corner.

Surrounding towns
Bethel Park has seven borders, including Castle Shannon to the north, Whitehall to the north-northeast, Baldwin to the northeast, South Park to the east and southeast, Peters Township in Washington County to the south, Upper St. Clair to the west, and Mt. Lebanon to the north-northwest.

Geology
The exposed rocks in Bethel Park are mostly composed of sandstone, limestone, shale, and a few coal layers (Redstone, Waynesburg, Washington, etc.). The ages of the exposed rocks bracket the late Pennsylvanian epoch (Gzhelian age; approximately 303 million years ago) near the lowest elevations, and Early Permian period (Asselian age; approximately 297 million years ago) near the highest parts of the southern part of Bethel Park (e.g. Rocky Ridge). These sedimentary rocks were deposited as the sea level rose and fell along an ancient coastline (with the region alternating between delta, shallow lake, and shallow sea), and finally being uplifted with the formation of the Appalachian Mountains.

Bethel Park is underlain by the Pennsylvania-age Monongahela Formation.  The Monongahela Formation consists of the Uniontown member and the underlying Pittsburgh member, and the base is the Pittsburgh coal seam.  Much of southern Allegheny County is undermined, and the PADEP indicates that all of Bethel Park was undermined.

A portion of the area is underlain by the Pittsburgh Terminal No. 8 Mine (Cortis and others, 1975), which was commonly known as the "H" Mine and the Coverdale Mine.  The mine opened around 1920.  The historic operations of the Coverdale Mine are apparent on a Bridgeville 7.5-minute topographic map.  A “Mine Dump” is shown adjacent to the Montour Railroad tracks and South Park Road.  Coal was mined through vertical shafts accessing inclined slopes following the dip of the Pittsburgh coal seam.  Mine voids in the inclined slope resulted from the practice of room and pillar mining during the early 20th century.  The Coverdale Mine is closed and largely unflooded.

Demographics

At the 2020 census there were 33,556 people, 13,362 households, and 9,540 families living in the Municipality. The population density was 2,869.8 people per square mile (1,108.3/km2). There were 13,871 housing units at an average density of 1,186.3 per square mile (458.1/km2).  The racial makeup of the borough was 97.10% White, 1.02% African American, 0.03% Native American, 1.11% Asian, 0.03% Pacific Islander, 0.13% from other races, and 0.58% from two or more races. Hispanic or Latino of any race were 0.49%.

There were 13,362 households, 30.3% had children under the age of 18 living with them, 62.0% were married couples living together, 7.2% had a female householder with no husband present, and 28.6% were non-families. 26.1% of households were made up of individuals, and 12.0% were one person aged 65 or older. The average household size was 2.48 and the average family size was 3.01.

The age distribution was 23.7% under the age of 18, 5.0% from 18 to 24, 26.8% from 25 to 44, 26.5% from 45 to 64, and 18.1% 65 or older. The median age was 42 years. For every 100 females there were 91.9 males. For every 100 females age 18 and over, there were 87.7 males.

The median household income was $53,791 and the median family income  was $64,390. Males had a median income of $47,876 versus $32,351 for females. The per capita income for the borough was $25,867. About 2.5% of families and 3.7% of the population were below the poverty line, including 4.1% of those under age 18 and 3.8% of those age 65 or over.

Arts and culture
Points of interest
Bethel Presbyterian Church
South Hills Village

Government
The Municipality's home rule status provides Bethel Park with greater powers of governance than the default form of borough government.  It is divided into nine wards of approximately equal population, each electing one member of the Bethel Park Municipal Council, and all together electing the mayor at large.  Both the mayor and the council member serve four-year terms.  Each council member is required to reside in the ward that they represent.

Education

Transportation 

The completion of the Pittsburgh Railways Interurbans in the early 1900s opened up Bethel Park to accelerated growth and development, making the area an early example of a streetcar suburb. While most of the Pittsburgh area's passenger rail and streetcar services were discontinued in the 1950s and 1960s and further growth was fueled by automobiles, the trolley lines through Bethel Park were kept in service and upgraded to modern light rail standards in the 1980s. All three of Port Authority of Allegheny County's light rail lines run through Bethel Park, with the Blue and Red lines terminating at South Hills Village, and the Silver Line passing through the central business district to its terminus in Library. Park-and-ride lots at South Hills Village, West Library, Lytle, and Washington Junction provide local commuters with an easy trip to Pittsburgh.

Pennsylvania Route 88 and U.S. Route 19 run through Bethel Park, with much of the area's busy commercial developments along the two corridors. The Yellow and Orange Belts of the Allegheny County belt system serve the borough, with the Orange Belt terminating in the southeast corner near the border with South Park. Interstate 79 and the Mon-Fayette Expressway do not enter Bethel Park but are both within a 15-minute drive from the borough. The cancelled South Hills Expressway was planned to be constructed along the Route 88 corridor.

In addition to light rail service, Port Authority's 36 Banksville and Mid Mon Valley Transit Authority's Commuter A routes provide bus service through the commercial areas of the borough.

Notable people
Terry K. Amthor, game designer
Barbara Feldon, actress
Armen Gilliam, basketball player
Scott Hahn, Catholic theologian
Nick Kwiatkoski, American football player
Steve Moakler, musician
Weird Paul Petroskey, lo-fi musician and a YouTube personality
Steve Previs, basketball player
Joe Serafini, actor
Tom Skladany, American football player
Mike Westhoff, American football coach
Jon Lloyd, YouTube personality

References

Further reading
Dodge, C. H., 1985.  Coal resources of Allegheny County, Pennsylvania—Part 1, Coal crop lines, mined-out areas, and structure contours. Pennsylvania Bureau of Topographic and Geologic Survey, Harrisburg, PA.  Mineral Resources Report M 89, 68 p. (loose-leaf, 8½" x 11"), 64 maps, scale approx. 1:62,500.
PADEP, 1999.  The Effects of Subsidence Resulting from Underground Bituminous Coal Mining on Surface Structures and Features and Water Resources.  Prepared under Authorization of Section 18a of the Bituminous Mine Subsidence and Land Conservation Act.  March 1999.

External links

Boroughs in Allegheny County, Pennsylvania
Home Rule Municipalities in Allegheny County, Pennsylvania
Populated places established in 1800